The Europe Zone was one of the three regional zones of the 1953 Davis Cup.

24 teams entered the Europe Zone, with the winner going on to compete in the Inter-Zonal Zone against the winners of the America Zone and Eastern Zone. Belgium defeated Denmark in the final and progressed to the Inter-Zonal Zone.

Draw

First round

Yugoslavia vs. Switzerland

Egypt vs. Austria

Finland vs. Ireland

Spain vs. Israel

Netherlands vs. Ceylon

Luxembourg vs. Norway

Second round

West Germany vs. South Africa

Yugoslavia vs. France

Austria vs. Denmark

Finland vs. Philippines

Spain vs. Sweden

Netherlands vs. Italy

Norway vs. Great Britain

Hungary vs. Belgium

Quarterfinals

France vs. West Germany

Denmark vs. Philippines

Italy vs. Sweden

Belgium vs. Great Britain

Semifinals

France vs. Denmark

Belgium vs. Italy

Final

Denmark vs. Belgium

References

External links
Davis Cup official website

Davis Cup Europe/Africa Zone
Europe Zone
Davis Cup